Catacombs are ancient underground passageways or subterranean cemeteries.

Catacombs may also refer to:

Catacomb culture, the Bronze Age culture
Catacombs of Paris, underground ossuaries in Paris, France
Catacomb (video game), a 1989 2-D top-down third-person shooter
Catacomb 3-D, video game
Catacombs (1965 film), a British film
Catacombs (1988 film), an American film
Catacombs (2007 film), an American film
Catacombe (film), a 2018 Dutch film
Catacombs (band), American doom metal project
Catacombs (album), a 2009 album by Cass McCombs
"Catacomb", a song by Stereophonics on their 2013 album Graffiti on the Train
The Catacombs (film), a 1940 Czech film
Catacombs (sex club), a gay and lesbian S/M fisting club in San Francisco